Rodolfo Bruno Ferraris (born 22 April 1992) is an Argentine professional footballer who plays as a right-back.

Career
Ferraris played in the youth of Estudiantes, which preceded a move to Agropecuario. Subsequent stints with Yupanqui and Juventud Unida then occurred. Ferraris agreed terms San Isidro de Lules's Almirante Brown in 2016, making three appearances in Torneo Federal B. He subsequently had a stint with Primera B Metropolitana's Deportivo Español, though didn't appear competitively for the club. In early 2017, Ferraris joined San Miguel in Primera C Metropolitana. Twelve appearances followed in his opening months, as they won promotion to the third tier.

On 30 June 2018, Ferraris completed a move to Colegiales. He departed twelve months later, after featuring ten times.

Career statistics
.

References

External links

1992 births
Living people
Place of birth missing (living people)
Argentine footballers
Association football defenders
Primera D Metropolitana players
Primera C Metropolitana players
Primera B Metropolitana players
Club Agropecuario Argentino players
Club Social y Deportivo Yupanqui players
Juventud Unida de San Miguel players
Deportivo Español footballers
Club Atlético San Miguel footballers
Club Atlético Colegiales (Argentina) players